Tracey Ullman's Show is a British sketch comedy television show devised by and starring Tracey Ullman. The show marks her first project for the BBC in over thirty years. The programme premiered on BBC One 11 January 2016. Series 3 premiered on HBO in the United States 28 September 2018.

Series overview

Episodes

Series 1 (2016)

Christmas special (2016)

Series 2 (2017)

Series 3 (2018)

References

External links 
 BBC episode guide
  for HBO
 

BBC-related lists
Lists of British comedy television series episodes
Tracey Ullman